Planitornoceras is a genus included in the goniatitid subfamily Aulatornoceratinae that lived during the Famennian stage at the end of the Devonian.  Its shell is extremely compressed, subinvolute to subevolute with an open umbilicus. Sides are always flat, outer rim (=venter) tabulate to slightly keeled.  No constrictions or spiral grooves, but some species have broad spiral depressions.  The adventitious lobe of the suture is widely rounded and asymmetric, the ventral lobe and saddle small, the dorsolateral saddle relatively short.

References

Planitornoceras in GONIAT Online 6/9/12
The Paleobiology Database Planitornoceras entry accessed 9 June 2012

Goniatitida genera
Tornoceratidae